Győr (names in other languages) is the main city of northwest Hungary, the capital of Győr-Moson-Sopron County and Western Transdanubia region, and – halfway between Budapest and Vienna – situated on one of the important roads of Central Europe.  It is the sixth largest city in Hungary, and one of its seven main regional centres. The city has county rights.

History
The area along the Danube River has been inhabited by varying cultures since ancient times.  The first large settlement dates back to the 5th century BCE; the inhabitants were Celts. They called the town Ara Bona "Good altar", later contracted to Arrabona, a name which was used until the eighth century. Its shortened form is still used as the German (Raab) and Slovak (Ráb) names of the city.

Roman merchants moved to Arrabona during the 1st century BCE. Around 10 CE, the Roman army occupied the northern part of Western Hungary, which they called Pannonia. Although the Roman Empire abandoned the area in the 4th century due to constant attacks by the tribes living to the east, the town remained inhabited.

Around 500 the territory was settled by Slavs, in 547 by the Lombards, and in 568–c. 800 by the Avars, at that time under Frankish and Slavic influence. During this time it was called Rabba and later Raab. Between 880 and 894, it was part of Great Moravia, and then briefly under East Frankish dominance.

The Magyars occupied the town around 900 and fortified the abandoned Roman fortress. Stephen I, the first king of Hungary, founded an episcopate there. The town received its Hungarian name Győr, which likely derives from Old Hungarian personal name Győr, who could be the county's first count.  The town was affected by all the trials and tribulations of the history of Hungary: it was occupied by Mongols during the Mongol invasion (1241–1242) and then was destroyed by the Czech army in 1271.

After the disastrous battle of Mohács, Baron Tamás Nádasdy and Count György Cseszneky occupied the town for King Ferdinand I while John Zápolya also was attempting to annex it. During the Ottoman occupation of present-day central and eastern Hungary (1541 - late 17th century), Győr's commander Kristóf Lamberg thought it would be futile to try to defend the town from the Turkish army. He burned down the town and the Turkish forces found nothing but blackened ruins, hence the Turkish name for Győr, Yanık kale ("burnt castle").

During rebuilding, the town was surrounded with a castle and a city wall designed by the leading Italian builders of the era. The town changed in character during these years, with many new buildings built in Renaissance style, but the main square and the grid of streets remained.

In 1594, after the death of Count János Cseszneky, captain of Hungarian footsoldiers, the Ottoman army occupied the castle and the town. In 1598 the Hungarian and Austrian army took control of it again and occupied it. During the Turkish occupation the city was called Yanık Kala (burned place, as a reference to the enormous damages caused by the siege).

In 1683, the Turks returned briefly, only to leave after being defeated in the Battle of Vienna.

During the following centuries, the town became prosperous. In 1743 Győr was elevated to free royal town status by Maria Theresa. The religious orders of Jesuits and Carmelites settled there, building schools, churches, a hospital, and a monastery.

On 14 June 1809, during the War of the Fifth Coalition, this was the site of the Battle of Győr (Battle of Raab), where the army of Eugène de Beauharnais defeated the Hungarian "noble insurrection" (militia) and an Austrian corps under the Archdukes Joseph and Johann. Napoleon's forces occupied the castle and had some of its walls blown up. The leaders of the town soon realized that the old ramparts were not useful any more. Most of the ramparts were destroyed, allowing the town to expand.

In the mid-19th century, Győr's role in trade grew as steamship traffic on the River Danube began. The town lost its importance in trade when the railway line between Budapest and Kanizsa superseded river traffic after 1861. The town leaders compensated for this loss with industrialisation. The town prospered until World War II when several buildings were destroyed. Some large-scale strategic bombing devastated industrial and residential areas as well as the airport. It was targeted because the Rába factory was a main tank (Turán) and aeroplane (Bf 109) producer. One of these raids destroyed some parts of the maternity hospital.

The 1950s and '60s brought more change: only big blocks of flats were built, and the old historical buildings were not given care or attention. In the 1970s the reconstruction of the city centre began; old buildings were restored and reconstructed. In 1989 Győr won the European award for the protection of monuments.

A 100-year-old Raba factory on the River Danube close to the historical centre is to be replaced by a new community called Városrét. The mixed-use community will have residential and commercial space as well as schools, clinics and parks.

The city's main theatre is the National Theatre of Győr, finished in 1978. It features large ceramic ornaments made by Victor Vasarely.

The city has several historical buildings, for example the castle, and the Lutheran Evangelic church.

Climate

Main sights 
The ancient core of the city is Káptalan Hill at the confluence of three rivers: the Mosoni-Danube, Rába, and Rábca. Püspökvár, the residence of Győr's bishops, can be easily recognized by its incomplete tower. Győr's oldest buildings are the 13th-century dwelling tower and the 15th-century Gothic Dóczy Chapel. The cathedral, originally in Romanesque style, was rebuilt in Gothic and Baroque style.

Other sights include:
Town Hall
Benedictine church of St. Ignatius of Loyola
Carmelite church
Museum of Roman Archaeology

The Pannonhalma Archabbey is located some  outside the town.

Renovation 

After the year 2000 the city started many big construction and renovation projects.

The bigger changes include:
 The Nádor-underpass, which relieved the Downtown's traffic infrastructure, and made the renovation of the Baross-Bridge possible.
 Renovation of the Baross-Bridge.
 Renovation of the old Soviet barracks and Bus Station by the company Leier.
 Development of the Széchenyi István University, which is in close connection with AUDI Hungária ZRT.
 Newly built Parking Houses which take off the high traffic load of the Downtown area. (e.g. József Attila and Dunakapu garage)
 Renovation of the inner-downtown district. Széchenyi-square, Dunakapu-square, the territory next to the Moson-Danube and Rába.
 Free City Bus which can used by everyone to get anywhere in the Downtown Area.
 The Győr Arcade at Városliget.
 The Kálóczy Square near the Széchenyi István University.
 The Jedlik Bridge, which enabled traffic & transport between Sziget and Révfalu district.
 The Rába Quelle thermal spa

Economy
Audi AG subsidiary company Audi Hungaria Zrt. has a large factory in Győr, where the Audi TT sports car, the A3 Cabriolet, A3 Limousine, and many engines (1,913,053 engines in 2007) are built.  The factory opened in 1994, at first producing inline-four engines for the Audi marque.  Business then grew to assembling the Audi TT Coupé and TT Roadster.  Eventually, V6 and V8 engines were also included, and after the acquisition of Automobili Lamborghini S.p.A., Audi then began to build V10 engines. The V10s for Audi vehicles are fully assembled here, but only the cylinder blocks for the Lamborghini V10.  Engines are also supplied to other Volkswagen Group marques, but over 90% of Audi vehicle engines are made here. By 2020, the factory has a 12 MW solar roof, producing 9.5 GWh/year.

Politics 
The current mayor of Győr is Csaba András Dézsi (Fidesz-KDNP).

The local Municipal Assembly, elected at the 2019 local government elections, is made up of 23 members (1 Mayor, 16 Individual constituencies MEPs and 6 Compensation List MEPs) divided into this political parties and alliances:

List of mayors
List of City Mayors from 1990:

Notable people
 Tamás Bakócz, archbishop
 Miklós Borsos, sculptor
 György Cseszneky, count, castellan
 János Cseszneky, count, infantry commander
 Josef Dobrovský
 Freddie
 Erzsébet Galgóczi, writer
 Anita Görbicz, handball player
 Izidor Guzmics
 Stanley Jaki
 Ányos Jedlik
 Andrew Karpati Kennedy, author and literary critic
 Tamás Kiss, footballer
 Gyula Kőnig
 Margit Kovács
 Raimondo Montecuccoli
 Árpád Orbán (1938–2008), footballer
 Desiderius Orban, painter, one of The Eight; emigrated in 1939 to Australia
 Antal Pusztai
 Alexander Raab, pianist
 Hans Richter, conductor
 Frigyes Riesz, mathematician
 Marcel Riesz, mathematician
 Samuel Aba, king of Hungary
 József Szlávy, prime minister of Hungary
 Miklós Takács de Saár, silviculturist, politician
 Tibor Varga
 Garcilaso de la Vega, poet
 Paul von Werner, Prussian Lieutenant General
 Emil Zuckerkandl

Transport 

The city is a national hub for rail and road traffic. The transport-geographical position of Győr is excellent. The most important railway connections are the Vienna-Budapest railway line, but the Győr-Sopron railway line owned by the Győr-Sopron-Ebenfurt railway company, as well as the Győr-Celldömölk railway line and the Győr-Veszprém railway run by MÁV. In Győr, several main transport routes meet each other (M1, M19, 1, 14, 81, 82, 83, 85), and the motorway is accessible from several parts of the city. Győr-Pér Airport can be reached from the city on Highway 81, 15 kilometers towards Székesfehérvár. At the 1734 km section of the Danube lies the port of Győr-Gönyű with its fully equipped 25 hectare serving terminal.

Sports
Győr is the home of the Győri ETO Sport Club, which has many sport divisions. The most popular sport in the city is handball, with the Győri ETO KC being the city's main team. ETO won the Champions League in 2013, 2014, 2017, 2018 and in 2019 and also reached the final in 2009, 2012 and in 2016. In addition, Győr reached the final of the EHF Cup Winners' Cup in 2006 and the final of the EHF Cup in 1999, 2002, 2004 and 2005.

WKW ETO FC Győr is a football team, currently (as of 2020/2021) in the Hungarian Second Division.

Twin towns – sister cities

Győr is twinned with:

 Brașov, Romania
 Colmar, France
 Erfurt, Germany
 Ingolstadt, Germany
 Kuopio, Finland
 Nizhny Novgorod, Russia
 Nof HaGalil, Israel
 Poznań, Poland
 Sindelfingen, Germany
 Wuhan, China
 Dunajská Streda, Slovakia

References

Notes

External links

  in Hungarian, English, and German
 Aerial photography: Győr,  civertan.hu, www.legifoto.com, www.latvany-terkep.hu 
 Aerial view of Gyor by Volkan Yuksel , Panoramio
 Győr at funiq.hu, with 'zoom in, zoom out' regional map
 Things to see and do in Győr 
 An online exhibition about the Jews of Győr during World War II, on Yad Vashem website.
Jewish Encyclopedia: "Raab (Hungarian, Györ)" by Gotthard Deutsch & Moritz Schwarz (1906).

 
County seats in Hungary
Cities with county rights of Hungary
Populated places in Győr-Moson-Sopron County
Serb communities in Hungary